, also known as Marcus Island, is an isolated Japanese coral atoll in the northwestern Pacific Ocean, located some  southeast of Tokyo and  east of the closest Japanese island, South Iwo Jima of the Volcano Islands, and nearly on a straight line between mainland Tokyo and Wake Island,  further to the east-southeast.

It is the easternmost territory belonging to Japan, and the only Japanese territory on the Pacific Plate, past the Japan Trench. Although small it is of strategic importance, as it enables Japan to claim a   exclusive economic zone in the surrounding waters. It is also the easternmost territory of Tokyo, being administratively part of Ogasawara Subprefecture. There is no civilian population, except personnel of the Japan Meteorological Agency, JSDF, and Japan Coast Guard serving temporary tours of duty on the island.

Access
The island is off-limits to civilians except for Japan Meteorological Agency staff, although reporters, documentary makers, and scientific researchers can sometimes get an entry permit. There are no commercial boat tours or flights to the island, and civilians are currently not allowed access to Minamitorishima for tours or sightseeing, due to its use by the Japan Self-Defense Forces (JSDF) as an observation station.

Because of its isolation, it is of some interest to amateur radio hobbyists, since the island is counted as a separate country for amateur radio awards based on station contacts.

Geography and geology

Minamitorishima is very isolated.

The island has a total land area of ). It takes about 45 minutes to walk around the island.

The sea is clear in the shallow area around Minamitorishima. At night, there is no light pollution, so rarely-noticed stars are clearly visible in the sky.

The island does not have soil adequate to produce substantial crops, so food is brought in by supply ships and planes. The only food grown on the island is papaya, mustard greens, and coconuts, and saltwater fish are caught offshore.

Minamitorishima area rare earth deposits 
After China restricted exports of strategic rare earth oxides (REO) in 2009 Japan started to explore its seabeds for deposits.

The research team found a mud layer  beneath the seabed that is extremely concentrated in REO. Analytical results showed that the maximum REO content in the mud was up to 0.66% REO.

In 2018 a scientific study of the seabed mud resulted in an estimate of 16 million tons of rare earth mineralised sediments within the studied area. The calculated rare-earth element and yttrium content for the research area was more than 16 million tons (average = 964ppm).

Wildlife
A member of the gecko family Gekkonidae called Perochirus ateles inhabits the island. In Japan, these are only found in Minamitorishima and South Iwo Jima. They are thought to have arrived from Micronesia on driftwood. 

There are also a large number of land snails called Achatina fulica with parasites which are harmful to humans. There are various forms of marine life in the ocean around the island. These include sea snakes, tuna, sharks, and some rare fish. Small fish are in the shallow area around the island.

Population
There are no local residents on Minamitorishima: Civilians are not allowed to reside there, and the personnel of the Japan Meteorological Agency, Japan Self-Defense Forces, and the Japan Coast Guard, only serve on the island for a limited period of time, and in limited numbers.

History

First known sightings
The first discovery and mention of an island in this area was made by a Spanish Manila galleon captain, Andrés de Arriola in 1694. It was charted in Spanish maps as Sebastián López, after Spanish Admiral Sebastián López, victorious in the battles of La Naval de Manila in 1646 against the Dutch. Its exact location was left unrecorded until further sightings in the 19th century.

Captain Bourn Russell (1794–1880) in the Lady Rowena departed Sydney, NSW, 2 November 1830 on a Pacific whaling voyage. On his return on 27 June 1832, he reported an island, not on his charts, which he named "William the Fourth's Island". The Sydney Herald reported Russell's  description of the size, shape, and orientation of the island and its reef, but misspelled his name and gave the island a southern hemisphere latitude.

The island was sighted again on 16 December 1864 by Captain Charles Gelett of the Hawaiian Evangelical Association's missionary ship Morning Star, and was called "Weeks Island" by him. Its position was recorded by a United States survey ship in 1874 and first sighted by a Japanese national, Kiozaemon Saito in 1879.

Colonization and sovereignty contention
On 30 June 1886, a Japanese man named Shinroku Mizutani (水谷新六,1850-1921) led a group of 46 colonists from Haha-jima in the Bonin Islands to settle on Marcus Island. The settlement was named "Mizutani" after the leader of the expedition. The Empire of Japan officially annexed the island 24 July 1898, the previous United States claim from 1889 according to the Guano Islands Act not being officially acknowledged. The island was officially named "Minamitorishima" and placed administratively under the Ogasawara Subprefecture of Tokyo (Tōkyō-fu). 

Sovereignty over the island before World War I was apparently disputed as various sources from the time move the island from the American to Japanese domain without specific explanation. In 1902, the United States dispatched a warship from Hawaii to enforce its claims but withdrew on finding the island still inhabited by Japanese, with a Japanese warship patrolling nearby. In 1914, William D. Boyce included Marcus Island as an obviously American island in his book, The Colonies and Dependencies of the United States. In 1933, by orders of the Japanese government, the civilian inhabitants of Minamitorishima were evacuated. In 1935, the Imperial Japanese Navy established a meteorological station on the island and built an airstrip.

World War II

After the start of World War II the Japanese garrison stationed on the island consisted of the 742-man Minamitorishima Guard Unit, under the command of Rear Admiral Masata Matsubara, and the 2,005-man 12th Independent Mixed Regiment of the Imperial Japanese Army, under the command of Colonel Yoshiichi Sakata. The United States Navy bombed it repeatedly in 1942 and in 1943, but never attempted to capture it (the island was featured in the U.S. film The Fighting Lady). Japan was able to resupply the garrison by submarine, using a channel, still visible today, cut through the reef on the northwest side of the island. The island was subject to repeated U.S. air attacks during World War II and finally surrendered when the destroyer  arrived on 31 August 1945.

U.S. occupation

The Treaty of San Francisco transferred the island to American control in 1952. The island was returned to Japanese control in 1968, but the Americans retained control of the airstrip and LORAN station. 

Before replacing Loran A for general marine navigation, Loran C was used by submarine-launched Polaris missile systems and the existence and location of Loran C stations was classified. LORANSTA Marcus Island was billeted for 23 U.S. Coast Guard personnel. The commissioning commanding officer was U.S. Coast Guard Lieutenant Commander Louis. C. Snell. A detachment of SeaBees remained on the island for several months making repairs to the island's airstrip. 

The island is extremely isolated. Coast guardsmen stationed on the island served one-year tours that were later modified to allow an R&R visit to mainland Japan at the six-month point. At the end of this isolated tour of duty, crew members received an additional 30 days of compensatory leave. 

While under U.S. administration, a C-130 Hercules from the 345th Tactical Airlift Squadron, Yokota Air Base, Japan, resupplied the island on weekly missions every Thursday. Coast guardsmen often amused themselves by judging aircraft landings, raising placards painted with large numbers. An unusually long four-hour ground time was scheduled to allow technicians who flew in to perform maintenance on the transmitter and to offload extra fuel from the C-130 to power the island's generator. It also allowed the coast guardsmen to read and answer letters while aircrews snorkeled and collected green glass fishing buoys that had washed up on the shore. During the Vietnam war era, the weekly log flight was a DC-6 flight conducted by the CIA-operated "Air America.”

Resumed Japanese administration
The Marcus Island station was transferred from the U.S. Coast Guard to the Japan Maritime Self Defense Force (JMSDF) on 30 September 1993 and was closed on 1 December 2009. 

The island is currently used for weather observation and has a radio station, but little else. The JMSDF garrison was supplied by C-130s from Iruma Air Base, or by C-130s from Haneda or Atsugi Air Base with flights via Iwo Jima on a weekly basis.

Climate
Minamitorishima has a tropical savanna climate (Köppen climate classification Aw), with warm to hot temperatures throughout the year. The wettest months are July and August, while the driest months are February and March.

See also
 Geography of Japan
 Japanese Archipelago
 List of extreme points of Japan
 Imperial Japanese Navy Land Forces
 List of reefs

Footnotes

References

Further reading 
 
 
 
 
 
 
 
 .

External links

 
 
 
 

Coral reefs
Atolls of Japan
Uninhabited islands of Japan
Former disputed islands
Former regions and territories of the United States
Pacific islands claimed under the Guano Islands Act
Japan Maritime Self-Defense Force
United States Coast Guard
Islands of Tokyo
Extreme points of Japan